La Chapelle-du-Châtelard is a commune in the Ain department in eastern France.

Geography
The Chalaronne forms the commune's southeastern border, flows northwest through the northern part of the commune, then forms part of its northwestern border.

Population

See also
Communes of the Ain department

References

Communes of Ain
Dombes
Ain communes articles needing translation from French Wikipedia